Success Talks is an organisation that creates interviews with successful individuals from across the world with a focus on digital media and mobile phone applications to promote key messages which challenges current stereotypes about success. The majority of the content can be found on its YouTube channel which was started in December 2012. Other interviews can also be found on its Facebook page and mobile phone app. Its channel has gained thousands of views as well as a good following on Facebook and Twitter. Success Talks have diversified into creating events and have worked with organisations such as PwC, Linklaters, Credit Suisse, Pearson and Teach First.

History
The concept arose when founder Dennis Owusu-Sem was having a conversation with a colleague about successful black individuals who were not in the fields of music, sport or entertainment. From this he decided to find as many people as he could interview to answer this and many other questions around success. Success Talks have also been quoted in publications such as the Financial Times.

Interviews
Success Talks have amassed over 40 interviews which have been released on YouTube, Facebook, Podcasts and its own app. Below are some of individuals currently on the series:

Baroness Patricia Scotland - Barrister and previous Attorney General for England and Wales and Advocate General for Northern Ireland
Ken Olisa - Chairman Restoration Partners
Karen Blackett - CEO Mediacom UK
Christine Ohuruogu - Great Britain Athlete and Olympian
Marc Hare - Founder of Mr Hare
Piers Linney - Co-CEO Outsourcery and "Dragon" on Dragons' Den
Raoul Shah -Founder and CEO of Exposure
Errol Douglas - Celebrity Hair Stylist
Courtenay Griffiths QC - Barrister at Bedford Court Chambers
Sandie Okoro - General Counsel HSBC
Anne-Marie Imafidon - Founder Stemettes
Samantha Tross - Orthopaedic Surgeon
Damon Buffini - Businessman and Ex- Managing Director Permira
Atul Kochhar - Chef, restaurateur and television personality
Adrien Sauvage - British fashion designer
Jamal Edwards - Founder and CEO, SB.TV
Walter White - Partner, McGuireWoods LLP
Vanessa Kingori - Publisher, British GQ
M. S. Banga (Vindi Banga) - Partner, Clayton, Dubilier & Rice
Paul Cleal - Partner, PwC
∗ Success Quotes

References

External links
Success Talks Website

Digital media
Interviews
Communications and media organisations based in the United Kingdom